William Boardman (14 October 1895−1968) was an English footballer who played as a forward in the Football League for Leeds United, Doncaster Rovers and Crewe Alexandra.

Playing career
He is first known to have played for Eccles Borough from where he moved to Leeds United after he represented the Manchester League against the Irish League. His debut for Leeds was on 6 November 1920 against Stoke City and that season he went onto make 3 more appearances.

In January 1922 he moved to Doncaster Rovers in the Midland League, and then played with them in the Third Division North when they were elected in 1923. He enjoyed success at Doncaster, scoring 37 times in 60 Midland League appearances in his first two seasons, and overall 61 times in 196 games.

He moved to Crewe for one season in 1927−28, and then to non-league Chester.

References

1895 births
1968 deaths
People from Urmston
Association football forwards
Doncaster Rovers F.C. players
Leeds United F.C. players
Crewe Alexandra F.C. players
Chester City F.C. players
English Football League players
Midland Football League players
Eccles United F.C. players
English footballers